The Betizu is a breed of small mountain cattle which live in a semi-feral state in some mountainous parts of the Basque Country in both Basque Country and France. It is classified as an endangered breed by both the Ministerio de Agricultura, Pesca y Alimentación, the agriculture ministry of Spain, and by the Conservatoire des Races d'Aquitaine in France.

It is one of a small number of semi-feral cattle populations in Europe, with the Albera of the Pyrenees, the Monchina of Cantabria, and the Raço di Biòu of the Camargue.

History 

The origins of the Betizu are unknown. It appears in Basque mythology as Zezengorri ("red bull"), guardian of the treasure of the goddess Mari.

The Betizu is sometimes believed to be the remnant of an ancient Pyrenean cattle population adapted to survive in marginal mountain terrain; or it may derive from animals lost or escaped during the annual transhumance.
The betizu has also been known by different authors and in different locations as the "vaca del país", "casta navarra" and "raza vasca".  José Miguel de Barandiarán has referred to it as the "vaca huraña".

In 2013 the breed population in Navarra was estimated at 254, while the number in Aquitaine was put at less than 150.

Navarre reserve
The Government of Navarre has launched a project to conserve this autochthonous breed. They own a herd that inhabits the abandoned village of Sastoya, in the Urraúl Alto valley. The stated goal of the project is to protect and expand this breed.

It is inside the area of Ecological Production and is property of the Government of Navarra. It is managed by their Environment Department. The facility includes several warehouses to manage the livestock.

The Sastoya reservation houses about 45 animals.  Reservation workers limit their contact with the animals in order to preserve their wild nature.

References 

Cattle breeds originating in Spain
Cattle breeds originating in France
Cattle breeds
Basque domestic animal breeds